The women's middleweight boxing competition at the 2012 Olympic Games in London was held from 5 to 9 August at the ExCeL Exhibition Centre.

For the first time at an Olympic Games, the 10 men's boxing events were joined by three women's events: flyweight, lightweight and middleweight.

Seventeen-year-old American Claressa Shields won gold in the women's middleweight, defeating Russia's veteran thirty-three-year-old Nadezda Torlopova by a score of 19–12 in the final. Her victory will be depicted in the film Flint Strong.

Competition format
The competition consisted of a single-elimination tournament. Bronze medals were awarded to both semi-final losers. Bouts were four rounds of two minutes each.

Schedule 
All times are British Summer Time (UTC+01:00)

Results

References

Boxing at the 2012 Summer Olympics
2012 in women's boxing
Women's events at the 2012 Summer Olympics